Carsten Olausson is a Swedish former footballer who played as a goalkeeper.

References

Living people
Association football goalkeepers
Swedish footballers
Allsvenskan players
Malmö FF players
Year of birth missing (living people)